Christopher McFarland   (August 7, 1861 – May 24, 1918) was a Major League Baseball outfielder for the 1884 Baltimore Monumentals of the Union Association.

External links
Baseball-Reference page

1861 births
1918 deaths
19th-century baseball players
Baseball players from Massachusetts
Major League Baseball outfielders
Baltimore Monumentals players